Roy Reed (February 14, 1930 – December 10, 2017) was an American journalist. He wrote about the Civil Rights Movement for The New York Times. He was the author of several books, including Looking for Hogeye (1986); a biography of Governor Orval Faubus, Faubus: The Life and Times of an American Prodigal (1997); and Beware of Limbo Dancers: A Correspondent's Adventures with the New York Times (2012). He also edited Looking Back at the Arkansas Gazette: An Oral History (2009). After leaving The New York Times in 1979, he taught in the Journalism Department of the University of Arkansas, Fayetteville, serving as chairman from 1981 to 1982. After his retirement, the Journalism Department established the Roy Reed Lecture Series in his honor. Reed died of a stroke on December 10, 2017.

References

External links

1930 births
2017 deaths
20th-century American journalists
American male journalists
21st-century American journalists
American biographers
Journalists from Arkansas
Military personnel from Arkansas
People from Hot Springs, Arkansas
People from Washington County, Arkansas
University of Missouri alumni